Cornell Anthony Gowdy (born October 2, 1963) is a former American football safety in the National Football League for the Dallas Cowboys and Pittsburgh Steelers. He played college football at Morgan State University.

Early years
Gowdy attended Central High School. He accepted a football scholarship from Morgan State University. He played as a linebacker, safety and cornerback. As a junior, he led the team in tackles.

Professional career
Gowdy was signed as an undrafted free agent by the Pittsburgh Steelers after the 1985 NFL Draft on May 8. He was waived before the start of the season on July 30.

In 1986, he was signed as a free agent by the Dallas Cowboys. He appeared in 3 games and was released on September 23.

He was released on August 31. After the NFLPA strike was declared on the third week of the season, those contests were canceled (reducing the 16 game season to 15) and the NFL decided that the games would be played with replacement players. In September, he was re-signed to be a part of the Steelers replacement team. He started 3 games and remained with the Steelers after the strike ended.

In 1988, he started 14 games, while taking over the strong safety position left by Donnie Shell. He was released on September 4, 1989.

Personal life
Gowdy was a scout for the New Orleans Saints from 1997 to 2003. He later served as a scout for the Kansas City Chiefs from 2003 to 2009.

References

External links
 Just Sports Stats

Living people
1963 births
American football defensive backs
Dallas Cowboys players
Kansas City Chiefs scouts
Morgan State Bears football players
Pittsburgh Steelers players
Players of American football from Washington, D.C.
New Orleans Saints scouts
National Football League replacement players